Territorial authorities are the second tier of local government in New Zealand, below regional councils. There are 67 territorial authorities: 13 city councils, 53 district councils and the Chatham Islands Council. District councils serve a combination of rural and urban communities, while city councils administer the larger urban areas. Five territorial authorities (Auckland, Nelson, Gisborne, Tasman and Marlborough) also perform the functions of a regional council and thus are unitary authorities. The Chatham Islands Council is a sui generis territorial authority that is similar to a unitary authority.

Territorial authority districts are not subdivisions of regions, and some of them fall within more than one region. Regional council areas are based on water catchment areas, whereas territorial authorities are based on community of interest and road access. Regional councils are responsible for the administration of many environmental and public transport matters, while the territorial authorities administer local roading and reserves, water supply and sanitation, building consents, the land use and subdivision aspects of resource management, and other local matters. Some activities are delegated to council-controlled organisations. The scope of powers is specified by the Local Government Act 2002.

List of territorial authorities 
There are currently 67 territorial authorities. Before the Auckland Council "super merge" in November 2010, there were 73 territorial authorities. Before the Banks Peninsula District Council merged with the Christchurch City Council in 2006, there were 74 territorial authorities.

 Population as of 
 Total of Christchurch City and Banks Peninsula areas
 Includes Stewart Island / Rakiura and the Solander Islands.

Offshore islands 
There are a number of islands where the Minister of Local Government is the territorial authority, two of which have a 'permanent population and/or permanent buildings and structures.' The main islands are listed below (population according to 2001 census in parenthesis): 

 Bare Island
 Mayor Island / Tūhua (3)
 Mōtītī Island (30)
 Moutohora Island
 Whakaari / White Island

In addition, seven of the nine groups of the New Zealand outlying islands are outside of any territorial authority:

 Kermadec Islands (3)
 New Zealand Subantarctic Islands
 Antipodes Islands
 Auckland Islands
 Bounty Islands
 Campbell Islands
 Snares Islands / Tini Heke
 Manawatāwhi / Three Kings Islands

Mayors 

Territorial authorities have a mayor–council government. Mayors in New Zealand are directly elected—at-large, by all eligible voters within a territorial authority—in the local elections to a three-year term. The Local Government Act 2002 defines the role of a mayor as having to provide leadership to the other elected members of the territorial authority, be a leader in the community and perform civic duties.

History

1989 local government reforms
For many decades until the local government reforms of 1989, a borough with more than 20,000 people could be proclaimed a city. The boundaries of councils tended to follow the edge of the built-up area, so little distinction was made between the urban area and the local government area.

New Zealand's local government structural arrangements were significantly reformed by the Local Government Commission in 1989 when approximately 700 councils and special purpose bodies were amalgamated to create 87 new local authorities. Regional councils were reduced in number from 20 to 13, territorial authorities (city/district councils) from 200 to 75, and special purpose bodies from over 400 to 7. The new district and city councils were generally much larger and most covered substantial areas of both urban and rural land. Many places that once had a city council were now being administered by a district council.

As a result, the term "city" began to take on two meanings.

City also came to be used in a less formal sense to describe major urban areas independent of local body boundaries. This informal usage is jealously guarded. Gisborne, for example, adamantly described itself as the first city in the world to see the new millennium. Gisborne is administered by a district council, but its status as a city is not generally disputed.

Under current law, an urban area has to be at least 50,000 residents before it can be officially proclaimed as a city.

Changes since 1989
Since the 1989 reorganisations, there have been few major reorganisations or status changes in local government. Incomplete list:
 1991: Invercargill re-proclaimed a city.
 1992: Nelson-Marlborough Regional Council abolished by a Local Government Amendment Act. Of its territorial authorities, Kaikoura District was transferred to the Canterbury Region, and Nelson City and Tasman and Marlborough districts became unitary authorities.
 1995: The Chatham Islands County was dissolved and reconstituted by an Act of Parliament as the "Chatham Islands Territory", with powers similar to those of territorial authorities and some functions similar to those of a regional council.
 2004: Tauranga became a city again on 1 March.
 2006: The Banks Peninsula District merged into Christchurch as a result of a 2005 referendum.
 2010: Auckland Council, a unitary authority, replaced seven local councils and the regional council.

Reports on completed reorganisation proposals since 1999 are available on the Local Government Commission's site (link below).

2007–2009 Royal Commission on Auckland Governance 
On 26 March 2009, the Royal Commission on Auckland Governance recommended the Rodney, North Shore, Waitakere, Auckland City, Manukau, Papakura and Franklin territorial councils and the Auckland Regional Council be abolished and the entire Auckland region to be amalgamated into one "supercity". The area would consist of one city council (with statutory provision for three Māori councillors), four urban local councils, and two rural local councils:
Rodney local council would lose Orewa, Dairy Flat, and Whangaparaoa but retain the remainder of the current Rodney District. The split areas as well as the current North Shore City would form a Waitemata local council.
 Waitakere local council would consist of the current Waitakere City as well as the Avondale area.
 Tamaki Makaurau would consist of the current Auckland City and Otahuhu (excluding CBD)
 Manukau local council would consist of the urban parts of the current Manukau City and of the Papakura District.
 Hunua local council would consist of the entire Franklin District, much of which is currently in the Waikato Region, along with rural areas of the current Papakura District and Manukau City.
 The entire Papakura District would be dissolved between urban and rural councils.

The National-led Government responded within about a week. Its plan, which went to a Select Committee, accepted the proposal for supercity and many community boards, but rejected proposals for local councils and, initially, no separate seats for Māori.

Public reaction to the Royal Commission report was mixed, especially in regards to the Government's amended proposal. Auckland Mayor John Banks supported the amended merger plans.

Criticism of the amended proposal came largely from residents in Manukau, Waitakere and North Shore Cities. In addition, Māori Affairs Minister Pita Sharples spoke against the exclusion of the Māori seats, as recommended by the Royal Commission. Opposition Leader Phil Goff called for a referendum on the issue.

Creation of Auckland Council 
Auckland Council was created on 1 November 2010 — a unitary authority that is classed as both a region and a territorial authority. It incorporated the recommendations of the Royal Commission and was established via legislation. Auckland Council is uniquely divided into "local boards" representing the lowest tier of local government.

Failed proposed changes
 2015: Proposals to amalgamate local councils in Wellington and Northland were accepted by the Local Government Commission for consideration, although following consultation they ultimately were not formed into a final proposal. The status quo remains.
 2015: Amalgamation of four local councils and the regional council in Hawke's Bay was proposed by the Local Government Commission. A district wide referendum was held in Sep-2015, and the proposal was defeated by 66% of voters.
 2015: The Local Government Commission received a proposal to review local government arrangements on the West Coast.  In August 2016 the Commission decided to progress the application.  The Commission then invited alternative applications to the original application. The Commission’s call for alternative  reorganisation applications or other proposals for change to West Coast local government arrangements closed on 15 March 2017. The Commission received 23 responses, 19 of which made specific proposals for change. In December 2017 the Local Government Commission determined its preferred option for local government reorganisation on the West Coast to be the transfer of district plan preparation from the Buller, Grey and Westland district councils to the West Coast Regional Council.

See also

 Community board
 Districts of New Zealand
 List of cities in New Zealand
 List of former territorial authorities in New Zealand
 List of towns in New Zealand
 Local Government New Zealand

References

Footnotes

External links 
 Local Councils (maintained by the Department of Internal Affairs)
 Local Government Services at the Department of Internal Affairs site (includes the Local Government Directory at the bottom of the page)
 Administration of Offshore Islands
 Local Government Commission site
 Local Government Online Limited site  (portal site owned by the Society of Local Government Managers and the Association of Local Government Information Management)
 Local Government New Zealand region and district boundaries – North Island
 Local Government New Zealand region and district boundaries – South Island
 Statistics New Zealand clickable map for local body and area unit detail over all of New Zealand

 
Territorial authorities
New Zealand 2